A try square or try-square is a woodworking tool used for marking and checking 90° angles on pieces of wood. Though woodworkers use many different types of square, the try square is considered one of the essential tools for woodworking.

The square in the name refers to the 90° angle. To try a piece of wood is to check if the edges and faces are straight, flat, and square to one another. A try square is so called because it is used to try how square the workpiece is.

Description 
A try square is made of two key parts, the blade (also known as a beam or tongue) and the stock, which are fixed together at 90° to form an 'L' shape.

The blade is usually made of wood or steel and is fixed into the stock, which is usually thicker than the blade and made of wood, metal or plastic. Both the stock and the tongue are usually made with parallel edges. Typically the blade and the stock will be rectangular in profile, though on some wooden squares the ends of the blade and the stock might be cut to a decorative shape. Some steel blades also have ruler markings for making measurements.

Often the top of the stock will not cover the full width of the blade so the stock does not get in the way when making a mark. This gap also allows space should an inaccurate blade need to be planed, filed or sanded.

Larger squares are used for tasks such as cabinetry, and are more likely to be made by the woodworker themselves, but other methods are often preferred for such larger tasks.

A common form of try square has a broad blade made of steel that is riveted into a stable, dense tropical hardwood stock, often ebony or rosewood. The inside of the wooden stock usually has a brass strip fixed to it to reduce wear.

On some squares the top of the stock is angled at 45°, so the square can be used as a mitre square for marking and checking 45° angles.

A similar type of square is the engineer's square used in metalworking and by some woodworkers. The blade is made with both a steel blade and a steel stock and is usually manufactured to a higher degree of accuracy.

Use 

The stock is usually held against the edge of the workpiece and either side of the tongue is then used as a straight edge for making a mark, or as a reference to check the accuracy of an angle.

When checking if an angle is square, the woodworker will test the workpiece in multiple places or will pun the square along the length of the workpiece. The woodworker might hold the workpiece up towards a light to help see any gaps between the workpiece and the square. Another method is to try sliding feeler gauges between the square and the workpiece.

For making a mark a woodworker might use a pencil, a pen or, for greater accuracy, a marking knife or blade.

History and symbolism 
Wooden try squares have survived from Ancient Egypt and Ancient Rome and can be seen in art from the time. From the 18th century squares began to be manufactured in factories, prior to that they were typically made from wood and made by the tradesmen themselves. Some woodworkers continue to make their own try squares.

The square is incorporated into the most common Freemasonry symbol, the Square and Compasses. Historically squares have also been used by woodworkers, such as joiners and carpenters, as symbols in signs and heraldry to represent their trade. The square as a symbol is also seen in artistic representations of the Christian saints Thomas the Apostle and James the Less.

Accuracy 

A square can become less accurate over time through both common use and abuse, such as the edges becoming worn over time or the square being dropped or mistreated. Wooden squares can also vary with changes in temperature and humidity. For this reason more dimensionally stable woods, such as mahogany, are preferred.

There are a number of methods for correcting an inaccurate square by hand. Wooden blades can be corrected using a hand plane and sandpaper, while metal blades can be corrected using a file, emery cloth, or sandpaper.

See also

 Combination square
 Machinist square
 Set square
 Steel square
 Speed square
 Square (tool)

References 

Dimensional instruments
Woodworking measuring instruments
Squares (tool)